Jiangxia District is one of 13 urban districts of the prefecture-level city of Wuhan, the capital of Hubei province, China, situated on the eastern (right) bank of the Yangtze River. It is the southernmost and most sparsely populated of Wuhan's districts. It borders the districts of Caidian and Hannan across the Yangtze and Hongshan to the north, as well as the prefecture-level cities of Ezhou to the east, Huangshi to the southeast, and Xianning to the south.

Geography

Unlike most other districts into which the City of Wuhan is divided, Jingxia, until recently included no part of Wuhan's main urban core. However, in the first decades of the 21st century urban development in the southeastern part of Wuhan's urban area (south of Guanggu Circle) has spilled over from Hongshan District into Jiangxia District as well.

Most of Jiangxia District still consists of the rural area south of the Wuhan city center.

The Longquanshan Scenic Area (龙泉山), which contains the tombs of the Ming Princes of Chu (Wuchang-based descendants of the Hongwu Emperor) is located in the northeastern part of Jiangxi District. That area must have been quite rural, and remote from the provincial capital, Wuchang, in the Ming days; but today's Wuhan has spread to within a few kilometers of Longquanshan.

Administrative divisions

Jiangxia District administers:

Climate

Infrastructure 
The Wuhan authorities with the approval of the central authorities are building a temporary 1000-bed  hospital in Jiangxia District to cope with the Wuhan coronavirus in January 2020. This is the second hospital to cope with the outbreak.

Transport
There are two  stations of the Line 8, Wuhan Metro in Jiangxia District: Huangjiahu Metro Town Station and Military Game Athlete Village Station.

The  Wulongquan East Railway Station (presently, no passenger service) which is part of the Wuhan-Guangzhou High-speed Railway is located within the district.

The Wuhan–Xianning Intercity Railway, the region's first dedicated commuter rail line, opened in the late 2013, has several stations in the district. In particular, the Zhifang East Station (纸坊东站) serves the district's urban core. It takes 40-50 min by commuter train from Zhifang East to Wuhan's Wuchang Railway Station.

As of 2012, the authorities were considering repurposing the military Shanpo Airfield (山坡机场), located in the district's Shanpo Township (Shanpo Subdistrict since August 2011), as a commercial cargo airport. The possibility for dual civil and military use is considered as well. If the plans are implemented, Shanpo will become Wuhan's second airport (after Tianhe).

Gallery

References

External links

 Jiangxia government official website

County-level divisions of Hubei
Geography of Wuhan